Pleasure to Kill is the second studio album by German thrash metal band Kreator, released in March 1986 by Noise Records.

Pleasure to Kill is widely considered a landmark thrash metal classic, along with Master of Puppets by Metallica, Peace Sells... but Who's Buying? by Megadeth, Reign in Blood by Slayer, Eternal Devastation by Destruction and Darkness Descends by Dark Angel, all released in 1986. The album played a considerable role in the development of many extreme metal subgenres, and death metal bands such as Cannibal Corpse cite the album as an influence. 

The lyrical themes follow those found on their first album Endless Pain, containing descriptions of macabre scenes of death and horror. Just like that album, Kreator were a three-piece band during the recording of Pleasure to Kill; on some early pressings, guitarist Michael Wulf, who was briefly a member of Kreator, was erroneously credited as a band member in the liner notes.

Reception 

In a contemporary review, Oliver Klemm of the German Metal Hammer called Kreator "the best death metal band in Europe after Celtic Frost" and described the album as obviously inspired by Possessed's Seven Churches, but "even louder, even faster, even more brutal". Rock Hard reviewer found the album very similar to Endless Pain and, despite the opaque drum sound, quite good by hardcore standards.

In a modern review, AllMusic writer Jason Anderson wrote that "many in the underground metal scene were already paying special attention to the German outfit's proto-death sound, but the cult status was shed after this critically and commercially successful second effort hit record-store shelves. As fierce and unyielding as the group's debut, Endless Pain, was, Pleasure to Kill provides double the sonic carnage and superior material." Canadian journalist Martin Popoff acknowledged the importance of the album in "propelling the band into the trinity of the genre next to Destruction and Sodom", but was not very pleased by the "tech-thrash ugliness" of the music.

Commercial performance 
Coinciding with the 2017 remastered issue, Pleasure to Kill charted for the first time 31 years after its release, and peaked at number 99 on the German album charts. The remastered edition of the band's 1989 album Extreme Aggression charted on the same day.

Accolades
Pleasure to Kill was ranked at number four on Loudwires top ten list of "Thrash Albums NOT Released by the Big 4".

Legacy
Varg Vikernes of Burzum was wearing a shirt of the album after the killing of Øystein Aarseth because his clothes were bloody.
In the German Netflix series Dark, character Ulrich Nielsen is a fan of the band as a teenager, the lyric 'My only aim is to take many lives / The more, the better I feel' from "Pleasure to Kill" leading police officer Egon Tiedemann to suspect he may be a Satanist.

Track listings

Personnel
Kreator
 Mille Petrozza – guitars, vocals (2, 4, 6, 7, 9)
 Rob Fioretti – bass
 Ventor – drums, vocals (3, 5, 8)

Production
 Harris Johns – producer, engineer
 Ralf Hubert – producer
 Maren Layout – design
 Fred Baumgart, Kreator – photography
 Phil Lawvere – cover artwork
 Mille Petrozza – remastering
 Karl-Ulrich Walterbach – executive producer

2017 re-release
 Andy Pearce, Matt Wortham – mastering
 Thomas Ewerhard, Jan Meininghaus – art, design
 Malcolm Dome – sleeve notes

Charts

References

External links
Kreator Terrorzone: Pleasure to Kill

1986 albums
Kreator albums
Noise Records albums
Albums produced by Harris Johns